The  was the regular edition of the annual Japanese national football cup tournament, which was held from 5 July 2014 to 13 December 2014

It was the first tournament since the 47th edition that the final match was not held on 1 January in the following year; it was moved to December due to the timing of the 2015 AFC Asian Cup in January 2015. It was also the first tournament since the 46th edition where the final match was not held at the National Stadium in Tokyo, due to major renovations that were scheduled in preparation for the 2020 Summer Olympics. Nissan Stadium in Yokohama was chosen as the venue for the 94th Final.

Normally, the winner would have qualified to the group stage of the 2015 AFC Champions League; however, Gamba Osaka had already qualified for this by virtue of being 2014 J.League Division 1 champions.

Calendar
All dates are in 2014

Participating clubs
88 clubs compete in the tournament. The 18 clubs from 2014 J.League Division 1 and 22 clubs from 2014 J.League Division 2 receive a bye to the second round of the tournament. Due to the establishment of J3 League, one seeded spot is given to A.C. Nagano Parceiro, the best amateur club participated in 2013 Emperor's Cup, along with the other 47 teams earned berths by winning their respective prefectural cup tournaments, which 10 clubs from 2014 J3 League (all clubs except Nagano and J.League Under-22 Team) and 14 clubs from 2014 Japan Football League have to go through to qualify, and enter from the first round.

Results

First round

Second round

Third round

Fourth round

Quarter-finals

Semi-finals

Final

This was the sixth final in the history of the Emperor's Cup involving at least one club from the second division.

References

External links

Emperor's Cup
Emperor's Cup
Cup